Ciranjang Station (CRJ) is a class III railway station located in Ciranjang, Ciranjang, Cianjur Regency. The station, which is located at an altitude of +262 m, is included in the Bandung Operational Area II.

Before being inactivated, the station had served the Cianjuran local train. However, this train service was discontinued in 2013 due to the availability of spare parts for hydraulic diesel locomotives which were scarce, as well as the unavailability of subsidies from the Government through the Ministry of Transportation of the Republic of Indonesia.

The station was about to be reactivated to welcome the Kian Santang train service which was planned to operate in March 2014, but was postponed again and failed to serve regular trips in 2015 due to problems with facilities and infrastructure that were deemed unfit for operation.

Starting 30 July 2019, the station began serving passengers again along with the inauguration of the extension of the Siliwangi train route which previously only served –.

Services
The following is a list of train services at the Ciranjang Station.

Passenger services
 Economy class

References

External links

Cianjur Regency
Railway stations in West Java
Railway stations opened in 1884